{{Infobox game
| title = Battle for Andromeda
| subtitle = Conflict for a Trillion Suns!
| image_link = 
| image_caption = | designer = 
| illustrator = 
| publisher = Taurus
| date = 
| players = 1–6
| setup_time = 
| playing_time = 
| random chance = 
| strategy = 
| random_chance = 
| skills = 
| footnotes =
}}Battle for Andromeda: Conflict for a Trillion Suns! is a 1976 board wargame published by Taurus Games.

GameplayBattle for Andromeda is a spacecraft combat game.

Reception
Steve Jackson reviewed Battle for Andromeda in The Space Gamer'' No. 11. Jackson concluded that "This game is totally unplayable. It is a disaster. [...] No one should buy this game. It is a perfect example of how NOT to design a game."

References

Board games introduced in 1976
Fiction set in the Andromeda Galaxy
Science fiction board games